Sint Vincentius Hospital (Dutch: Sint Vincentiusziekenhuis) is a hospital in Paramaribo, Suriname. It is Catholic hospital named after Saint Vincentius.

History 
The hospital has its roots in a congregation of Sisters of Love from Tilburg who were deployed to Suriname in 1894. Out of the infirmary they started, the Sint Vincentius Hospital was founded in 1916, originally with a capacity of 70 beds. With the passing of time the hospital became more professional and shifted its focus from charity to professional medical care. The hospital was expanded in 1964, 1976 and 1978.

In 1970, the foundation running the hospital was transformed from a church body into a board of lay people.

See also 
Academic Hospital Paramaribo, a university hospital of Paramaribo;
's Lands Hospitaal, a general hospital in Paramaribo
Diakonessenhuis, a Protestant hospital in Paramaribo

References

Hospitals in Suriname
Catholic hospitals in South America
Buildings and structures in Paramaribo